The Lisbon massacre started on Sunday, 19 April 1506 in Lisbon when a crowd of church-goers attacked and killed several persons in the congregation whom they suspected were Jews. The violence escalated into a city-wide, anti-semitic riot that killed as many as 4,000 "new Christians" (Jews that had been forcibly converted to Christianity).

Background
When King Manuel I took the throne in 1495 he liberalized the status of Jews who had been held in virtual slavery. In 1496, under pressure from the Catholic Monarchs of Spain, he ordered all Jews to either accept baptism or leave the country. However, Manuel did not want to lose an important and productive part of the population, so in 1497, before the deadline for their departure, he had all Jews converted by royal decree. This included the native Portuguese Jews as well as a sizeable population of Jews who had fled Spain after the Edict of Expulsion in 1492. In 1499, Manuel forbade the New Christians to leave the country.

The original Christian population resented the recent converts. They were angered by this new source of economic competition and suspected that many of the converts continued to observe the Jewish faith in secret. Despite the king's efforts to maintain the peace, there were occasional outbursts of violence against the New Christians culminating in the Lisbon massacre in 1506.

The massacre

The massacre began in the Church of São Domingos on Sunday, 19 April 1506. The faithful were praying for an end to the drought and plague that were sweeping the country when several worshippers claimed they saw a strange light emanating from a crucifix in the Chapel of Jesus. Word of the apparent miracle spread and soon the church was packed with a great crowd that included German and French sailors from trading ships in the harbor. 

The crowd became incensed when a New Christian ridiculed the claims of a miracle. A fight broke out in the church and the man was killed along with other New Christians who were present. The mob spilled out of the church and began killing any New Christians they came across. They built a pyre on the church square and threw the bodies of their victims into the fire.

Authorities were unable to subdue the mob and more rioters joined, attracted by the opportunities for looting. Violence spread throughout the city. New Christians, regardless of age or sex, were murdered and their homes looted. Even some Old Christians became victims of the mayhem. By Monday evening the violence seemed to be ending but Dominican friars from the Monastery of São Domingos organized a procession and urged the crowd to kill the "heretics" and "extinguish the wicked race." The rampage continued until Thursday, when a religious procession calling for peace marched through the city and restored order.

Reports of the numbers killed vary from less than 1,000 to more than 4,000. Most were New Christians but some Old Christians were also murdered. At least one important royal official, João Rodrigues Mascarenhas, was killed. Mascarenhas, a New Christian and a tax collector, was undoubtedly a focus of public hatred.

Aftermath

The king and the court had earlier left Lisbon for Abrantes to escape the plague, and were absent when the massacre began. When King Manuel I was informed of events in Lisbon, he ordered the governor to hurry to the city and "hang all the evil doers responsible for the massacre." For Manuel, the complete breakdown of order was a challenge to his authority and an international embarrassment. It also represented a failure of his efforts to integrate the recently converted Jews into Portuguese society.

The king's retribution was swift and brutal. Participants in the massacre were summarily executed without trial. Two of the Dominican friars who had encouraged the rioters were stripped of their religious orders, strangled, and burnt. Some perpetrators fled the city but were arrested and executed later when they attempted to return. Approximately 500 rioters were executed. The only persons to largely escape justice were the foreign sailors and merchants who returned to the ships with their loot and sailed away.

Manuel also punished the institutions complicit in the massacre. São Domingos Abby was closed down for eight years and the city of Lisbon lost important privileges, including the expulsion of the city representatives from the Council of the Crown.

Following the massacre, hundreds of New Christians ignored the royal decree forbidding emigration and fled Portugal while some who remained still felt deep allegiance to the Portuguese monarch. On 1 March 1507, Manuel issued an edict that legalised the emigration of New Christians from Portugal.

The massacre was widely reported in Europe. Several contemporary accounts have survived including one by noted historian, Gaspar Correia, which was rediscovered at an auction house in the 1970s.

References

Bibliography
 
 
 

 

Antisemitism in Portugal
Conflicts in 1506
1506 in Portugal
Jews and Judaism in Lisbon
Massacres in Portugal
History of Lisbon
Anti-Jewish pogroms
Massacres in Europe
Massacres in 1506